Amaxia disconsistens is a moth of the family Erebidae. It was described by Paul Dognin in 1923. It is found in Brazil.

References

Moths described in 1923
Amaxia
Moths of South America